Comba  is an Italian surname. Notable people with the surname include:

Emilio Comba (1839–1904), Waldensian pastor and historian
Enrico Comba (1956–2020), Italian historian and anthropologist
Franck Comba (born 1971), French rugby union player
Ivano Comba (1960–2022), Italian professional footballer
Maximiliano Comba (born 1994), Argentine professional footballer
Paul G. Comba (1926–2017), Italian astronomer 
Rocío Comba (born 1987), Argentine discus thrower
Sérgio Comba (born 1978), Argentine footballer

See also 

 Comba (disambiguation)
 Combi (surname)

Italian-language surnames